Harvey Bullock (born June 4, 1921 in Oxford, North Carolina – died April 24, 2006) was an American television and film writer and producer. His work with R.S. Allen included episodes for The Andy Griffith Show, Hogan's Heroes, Love, American Style, and Alice, along with the films Who's Minding the Mint?, With Six You Get Eggroll and Girl Happy.

He graduated from Duke University with a Bachelor of Arts in English.

He served with the US Navy in a special operations unit called "Beach Jumpers" during World War II, writing and transmitting false messages over radio in order to deceive the Nazis. After the war, he served stateside in Hawaii.

In 1956, he was married to Betty Jane Folker. Together they had four children: Kerry Scarvie, Diana Bullock, Courtney Bullock and Andy Bullock; and three grandchildren: Sean Bullock, Samantha Scarvie and Andrew Scarvie.

In DC Comics' Batman series, a police officer sharing Bullock's name was named as such as a tribute to Bullock.

Bullock died at the age of 84 on April 24, 2006, due to age-related illness.

Awards and nominations 

Bullock (with Allen) received a Random House award in 1956, and were nominated for an Emmy award in 1976 for a children's program called Papa and Me.

Television credits 

The Andy Griffith Show
Hogan's Heroes
The Flintstones
Top Cat
The Dick Van Dyke Show
The Danny Thomas Show
I Spy
Gomer Pyle, U.S.M.C.
Wait Till Your Father Gets Home
Alice
The Love Boat
The Jetsons
Return to Mayberry

Film credits 

Honeymoon Hotel
Girl Happy
The Man Called Flintstone
Who's Minding the Mint?
With Six You Get Eggroll
Don't Drink the Water

Book credits 
The Fat Book - How to be a happy heavy in a stupid skinny world
How to Cheat on Your Diet

References

Harvey Bullock AP obituary

Harvey Bullock bio at Emmys.org

External links
 
 Harvey Bullock obituary from News From Me

1921 births
2006 deaths
People from Oxford, North Carolina
American male screenwriters
American television writers
American television producers
Place of death missing
Duke University Trinity College of Arts and Sciences alumni
American male television writers
Screenwriters from North Carolina
20th-century American male writers
20th-century American screenwriters
People from Binghamton, New York